Northland High School (NHS) is a public high school in Columbus, Ohio, United States, NHS is a part of the Columbus City Schools system and opened in 1965. The current principal is Jason Johnson and athletic teams are known as the Vikings with school colors of green and gold.

State championships
Girls basketball – 1982
Boys basketball – 2009

Notable alumni
Jude Adjei-Barimah, professional football player in the National Football League (NFL)
Trey Burke, professional basketball player in the National Basketball Association (NBA)
Jared Sullinger, professional basketball player in the NBA
Happy Chichester, singer, songwriter, and musician
Devon Scott (born 1994), basketball player in the Korean Basketball League
Pat Tiberi, Republican Representative for Ohio's 12th Congressional District, 2001-2018
Seth Towns a player for Harvard who won Ivy League Player of the Year
Georgeann Wells, first woman to register a dunk in an official NCAA intercollegiate basketball game 
Dwight Yoakam, Grammy-winning country singer/songwriter; actor and filmmaker
Fly Union, musical group

References

External links

Educational institutions established in 1965
High schools in Columbus, Ohio
Public high schools in Ohio
1965 establishments in Ohio